Alexander's Ragtime Band is a 1911 composition by American songwriter Irving Berlin. It may also refer to:

 Alexander's Ragtime Band (film), a 1938 film by American director Henry King
 Alexander's Ragtime Band (band), a ragtime band in Trinidad and Tobago